The Namibia Fed Cup team represents Namibia in Fed Cup tennis competition and are governed by the Namibia Tennis Association.  They have not competed since 2015.

History
Namibia competed in its first Fed Cup in 2004.  Their best result was fifth in Group III in 2005.

See also
Fed Cup
Namibia Davis Cup team

External links

Billie Jean King Cup teams
Fed Cup
Fed Cup